Love Lies may refer to:
Love Lies (1932 film), British film based on Stanley Lupino's 1929 musical of the same name
Love Lies (1989 film), Mexican film directed by Arturo Ripstein
Love, Lies (2016 film), South Korean film directed by Park Heung-sik
Love Lies (Cristy Lane album), a 1978 album by Cristy Lane
Love Lies (Janie Fricke album), a 1983 album by Janie Fricke
"Love Lies" (song), a song by Normani and Khalid from the Love, Simon soundtrack
"Love Lies", a song by Bon Jovi from the 1984 album Bon Jovi
"Love Lies", a song by Diana Ross from the 1982 album Silk Electric

See also
Love and Lies (disambiguation)